The House of Blue Light is the twelfth studio album by English rock band Deep Purple, released on 16 January 1987 by Polydor Records. It was the second recording by the reformed Mark II line-up, and the sixth studio album overall by this formation of the band.

Recording
The album's creation was an exceedingly long and difficult process, which singer Ian Gillan compared to the recording of Who Do We Think We Are in Rome. Gillan has remarked on how strained relations within the band compromised the album: "I look back at House Of Blue Light, there are some good songs on that record, but there’s something missing in the overall album. I can’t feel the spirit of this band. I can see or hear five professionals doing their best, but it’s like a football team, it’s not functioning. It’s like 11 superstars that are playing on the same field but are not connected by the heart or by the spirit." Guitarist Ritchie Blackmore has said much of it was re-recorded, and confessed, "I think I played like shit on it, and I don't think anyone else really got that into it."  Added organist Jon Lord, "House of Blue Light was a weird album and hard to put together. We made the massive mistake of trying to make our music current. We discovered that people didn't want us to do that."

Despite the band's concerns, House of Blue Light sold well. It hit No. 10 in the UK charts, No. 34 on the Billboard 200 in the United States, and reached the top 10 in six other countries.

Promotion
Two promotional videos to the songs "Bad Attitude" and "Call of the Wild" were produced, both of which feature members of the band.

Track listing
Note: Several tracks on the LP and cassette versions are shorter than those on the original CD released in 1987. The 1999 CD remaster used the original vinyl master tapes, meaning its running time is also shorter than the original CD version.

All tracks written by Ritchie Blackmore, Ian Gillan and Roger Glover, except where noted.

1987 CD edition

Vinyl, cassette and 1999 CD edition

Personnel
Deep Purple
 Ian Gillan – vocals, harmonica
 Ritchie Blackmore – guitars
 Roger Glover – bass
 Jon Lord – keyboards
 Ian Paice – drums, percussion

Production
 Produced by Roger Glover and Deep Purple
 Recorded at the Playhouse, Stowe, Vermont, with Le Mobile operated by Guy Charbonneau
 Engineered by Nick Blagona
 Mixed by Harry Schnitzler at Union Studios, Munich, West Germany
 Mastered by Greg Calbi at Sterling Sound, New York

Charts

Weekly charts

Year-end charts

Singles

Certifications

References

Deep Purple albums
1987 albums
Albums produced by Roger Glover
Polydor Records albums
Mercury Records albums